James M. Seitzinger (1846–1924) was an American recipient of Medal of Honor which he was awarded on March 1, 1906.

Biography
Seitzinger was born on November 24, 1846, in Pottsville, Pennsylvania. In April 1864, he joined Company G of the 116th Pennsylvania Infantry along with his father Israel. Together they fought in the Battle of the Wilderness, Battle of Cold Harbor, Battle of Spotsylvania and Battle of Petersburg. On August 25, 1864, he was nominated for the Medal of Honor recipient, for his courageous flag rescue, but didn't receive the medal until March 1, 1906. He died at the age of 77, on January 14, 1924, and was buried at Christ Church Cemetery in Fountain Springs, Pennsylvania.

References

1846 births
1924 deaths
People of Pennsylvania in the American Civil War
American Civil War recipients of the Medal of Honor
United States Army Medal of Honor recipients
Union Army soldiers